Naturally occurring tungsten (74W) consists of five isotopes. Four are considered stable (182W, 183W, 184W, and 186W) and one is slightly radioactive, 180W, with an extremely long half-life of 1.8 ± 0.2 exayears (1018 years). On average, two alpha decays of 180W occur per gram of natural tungsten per year, so for most practical purposes, tungsten can be considered stable. Theoretically, all five can decay into isotopes of element 72 (hafnium) by alpha emission, but only 180W has been observed to do so. The other naturally occurring isotopes have not been observed to decay (they are observationally stable), and lower bounds for their half lives have been established:

182W, t1/2 > 7.7×1021 years

183W, t1/2 > 4.1×1021 years

184W, t1/2 > 8.9×1021 years

186W, t1/2 > 8.2×1021 years

Thirty-three artificial radioisotopes of tungsten have been characterized with mass numbers ranging from 157 to 194, the most stable of which are 181W with a half-life of 121.2 days, 185W with a half-life of 75.1 days, 188W with a half-life of 69.4 days and 178W with a half-life of 21.6 days. All of the remaining radioactive isotopes have half-lives of less than 24 hours, and most of these have half-lives that are less than 8 minutes. Tungsten also has 11 meta states with mass numbers of 158, 179, with 3, 180, with 2, 183, 185, 186, with 2, and 190, the most stable being 179m1W (t1/2 6.4 minutes).

List of isotopes 

|-
| 158W
| style="text-align:right" | 74
| style="text-align:right" | 84
| 157.97456(54)#
| 1.37(17) ms
| α
| 154Hf
| 0+
|
|
|-
| style="text-indent:1em" | 158mW
| colspan="3" style="text-indent:2em" | 1889(8) keV
| 143(19) μs
|
|
| 8+
|
|
|-
| rowspan=2|159W
| rowspan=2 style="text-align:right" | 74
| rowspan=2 style="text-align:right" | 85
| rowspan=2|158.97292(43)#
| rowspan=2|8.2(7) ms
| α (82%)
| 155Hf
| rowspan=2|7/2−#
| rowspan=2|
| rowspan=2|
|-
| β+ (18%)
| 159Ta
|-
| rowspan=2|160W
| rowspan=2 style="text-align:right" | 74
| rowspan=2 style="text-align:right" | 86
| rowspan=2|159.96848(22)
| rowspan=2|90(5) ms
| α (87%)
| 156Hf
| rowspan=2|0+
| rowspan=2|
| rowspan=2|
|-
| β+ (14%)
| 160Ta
|-
| rowspan=2|161W
| rowspan=2 style="text-align:right" | 74
| rowspan=2 style="text-align:right" | 87
| rowspan=2|160.96736(21)#
| rowspan=2|409(16) ms
| α (73%)
| 157Hf
| rowspan=2|7/2−#
| rowspan=2|
| rowspan=2|
|-
| β+ (23%)
| 161Ta
|-
| rowspan=2|162W
| rowspan=2 style="text-align:right" | 74
| rowspan=2 style="text-align:right" | 88
| rowspan=2|161.963497(19)
| rowspan=2|1.36(7) s
| β+ (53%)
| 162Ta
| rowspan=2|0+
| rowspan=2|
| rowspan=2|
|-
| α (47%)
| 158Hf
|-
| rowspan=2|163W
| rowspan=2 style="text-align:right" | 74
| rowspan=2 style="text-align:right" | 89
| rowspan=2|162.96252(6)
| rowspan=2|2.8(2) s
| β+ (59%)
| 163Ta
| rowspan=2|3/2−#
| rowspan=2|
| rowspan=2|
|-
| α (41%)
| 159Hf
|-
| rowspan=2|164W
| rowspan=2 style="text-align:right" | 74
| rowspan=2 style="text-align:right" | 90
| rowspan=2|163.958954(13)
| rowspan=2|6.3(2) s
| β+ (97.4%)
| 164Ta
| rowspan=2|0+
| rowspan=2|
| rowspan=2|
|-
| α (2.6%)
| 160Hf
|-
| rowspan=2|165W
| rowspan=2 style="text-align:right" | 74
| rowspan=2 style="text-align:right" | 91
| rowspan=2|164.958280(27)
| rowspan=2|5.1(5) s
| β+ (99.8%)
| 165Ta
| rowspan=2|3/2−#
| rowspan=2|
| rowspan=2|
|-
| α (.2%)
| 161Hf
|-
| rowspan=2|166W
| rowspan=2 style="text-align:right" | 74
| rowspan=2 style="text-align:right" | 92
| rowspan=2|165.955027(11)
| rowspan=2|19.2(6) s
| β+ (99.96%)
| 166Ta
| rowspan=2|0+
| rowspan=2|
| rowspan=2|
|-
| α (.035%)
| 162Hf
|-
| rowspan=2|167W
| rowspan=2 style="text-align:right" | 74
| rowspan=2 style="text-align:right" | 93
| rowspan=2|166.954816(21)
| rowspan=2|19.9(5) s
| β+ (>99.9%)
| 167Ta
| rowspan=2|3/2−#
| rowspan=2|
| rowspan=2|
|-
| α (<.1%)
| 163Hf
|-
| rowspan=2|168W
| rowspan=2 style="text-align:right" | 74
| rowspan=2 style="text-align:right" | 94
| rowspan=2|167.951808(17)
| rowspan=2|51(2) s
| β+ (99.99%)
| 168Ta
| rowspan=2|0+
| rowspan=2|
| rowspan=2|
|-
| α (.0319%)
| 164Hf
|-
| 169W
| style="text-align:right" | 74
| style="text-align:right" | 95
| 168.951779(17)
| 76(6) s
| β+
| 169Ta
| (5/2−)
|
|
|-
| rowspan=2|170W
| rowspan=2 style="text-align:right" | 74
| rowspan=2 style="text-align:right" | 96
| rowspan=2|169.949228(16)
| rowspan=2|2.42(4) min
| β+(99%)
| 170Ta
| rowspan=2|0+
| rowspan=2|
| rowspan=2|
|-
| α (1%)
| 166Hf
|-
| 171W
| style="text-align:right" | 74
| style="text-align:right" | 97
| 170.94945(3)
| 2.38(4) min
| β+
| 171Ta
| (5/2−)
|
|
|-
| 172W
| style="text-align:right" | 74
| style="text-align:right" | 98
| 171.94729(3)
| 6.6(9) min
| β+
| 172Ta
| 0+
|
|
|-
| 173W
| style="text-align:right" | 74
| style="text-align:right" | 99
| 172.94769(3)
| 7.6(2) min
| β+
| 173Ta
| 5/2−
|
|
|-
| 174W
| style="text-align:right" | 74
| style="text-align:right" | 100
| 173.94608(3)
| 33.2(21) min
| β+
| 174Ta
| 0+
|
|
|-
| 175W
| style="text-align:right" | 74
| style="text-align:right" | 101
| 174.94672(3)
| 35.2(6) min
| β+
| 175Ta
| (1/2−)
|
|
|-
| 176W
| style="text-align:right" | 74
| style="text-align:right" | 102
| 175.94563(3)
| 2.5(1) h
| EC
| 176Ta
| 0+
|
|
|-
| 177W
| style="text-align:right" | 74
| style="text-align:right" | 103
| 176.94664(3)
| 132(2) min
| β+
| 177Ta
| 1/2−
|
|
|-
| 178W
| style="text-align:right" | 74
| style="text-align:right" | 104
| 177.945876(16)
| 21.6(3) d
| EC
| 178Ta
| 0+
|
|
|-
| 179W
| style="text-align:right" | 74
| style="text-align:right" | 105
| 178.947070(17)
| 37.05(16) min
| β+
| 179Ta
| (7/2)−
|
|
|-
| rowspan=2 style="text-indent:1em" | 179m1W
| rowspan=2 colspan="3" style="text-indent:2em" | 221.926(8) keV
| rowspan=2|6.40(7) min
| IT (99.72%)
| 179W
| rowspan=2|(1/2)−
| rowspan=2|
| rowspan=2|
|-
| β+ (.28%)
| 179Ta
|-
| style="text-indent:1em" | 179m2W
| colspan="3" style="text-indent:2em" | 1631.90(8) keV
| 390(30) ns
|
|
| (21/2+)
|
|
|-
| style="text-indent:1em" | 179m3W
| colspan="3" style="text-indent:2em" | 3348.45(16) keV
| 750(80) ns
|
|
| (35/2−)
|
|
|-
| 180W
| style="text-align:right" | 74
| style="text-align:right" | 106
| 179.946704(4)
| 1.8(0.2)×1018 y
| α
| 176Hf
| 0+
| 0.0012(1)
|
|-
| style="text-indent:1em" | 180m1W
| colspan="3" style="text-indent:2em" | 1529.04(3) keV
| 5.47(9) ms
| IT
| 180W
| 8−
|
|
|-
| style="text-indent:1em" | 180m2W
| colspan="3" style="text-indent:2em" | 3264.56(21) keV
| 2.33(19) μs
|
|
| 14−
|
|
|-
| 181W
| style="text-align:right" | 74
| style="text-align:right" | 107
| 180.948197(5)
| 121.2(2) d
| EC
| 181Ta
| 9/2+
|
|
|-
| 182W
| style="text-align:right" | 74
| style="text-align:right" | 108
| 181.9482042(9)
| colspan=3 align=center|Observationally Stable
| 0+
| 0.2650(16)
|
|-
| 183W
| style="text-align:right" | 74
| style="text-align:right" | 109
| 182.9502230(9)
| colspan=3 align=center|Observationally Stable
| 1/2−
| 0.1431(4)
|
|-
| style="text-indent:1em" | 183mW
| colspan="3" style="text-indent:2em" | 309.493(3) keV
| 5.2(3) s
| IT
| 183W
| 11/2+
|
|
|-
| 184W
| style="text-align:right" | 74
| style="text-align:right" | 110
| 183.9509312(9)
| colspan=3 align=center|Observationally Stable
| 0+
| 0.3064(2)
|
|-
| 185W
| style="text-align:right" | 74
| style="text-align:right" | 111
| 184.9534193(10)
| 75.1(3) d
| β−
| 185Re
| 3/2−
|
|
|-
| style="text-indent:1em" | 185mW
| colspan="3" style="text-indent:2em" | 197.43(5) keV
| 1.597(4) min
| IT
| 185W
| 11/2+
|
|
|-
| 186W
| style="text-align:right" | 74
| style="text-align:right" | 112
| 185.9543641(19)
| colspan=3 align=center|Observationally Stable
| 0+
| 0.2843(19)
|
|-
| style="text-indent:1em" | 186m1W
| colspan="3" style="text-indent:2em" | 1517.2(6) keV
| 18(1) μs
|
|
| (7−)
|
|
|-
| style="text-indent:1em" | 186m2W
| colspan="3" style="text-indent:2em" | 3542.8(21) keV
| >3 ms
|
|
| (16+)
|
|
|-
| 187W
| style="text-align:right" | 74
| style="text-align:right" | 113
| 186.9571605(19)
| 23.72(6) h
| β−
| 187Re
| 3/2−
|
|
|-
| 188W
| style="text-align:right" | 74
| style="text-align:right" | 114
| 187.958489(4)
| 69.78(5) d
| β−
| 188Re
| 0+
|
|
|-
| 189W
| style="text-align:right" | 74
| style="text-align:right" | 115
| 188.96191(21)
| 11.6(3) min
| β−
| 189Re
| (3/2−)
|
|
|-
| 190W
| style="text-align:right" | 74
| style="text-align:right" | 116
| 189.96318(18)
| 30.0(15) min
| β−
| 190Re
| 0+
|
|
|-
| style="text-indent:1em" | 190mW
| colspan="3" style="text-indent:2em" | 2381(5) keV
| <3.1 ms
|
|
| (10−)
|
|
|-
| 191W
| style="text-align:right" | 74
| style="text-align:right" | 117
| 190.96660(21)#
| 20# s[>300 ns]
|
|
| 3/2−#
|
|
|-
| 192W
| style="text-align:right" | 74
| style="text-align:right" | 118
| 191.96817(64)#
| 10# s[>300 ns]
|
|
| 0+
|
|

References

 Isotope masses from:

 Isotopic compositions and standard atomic masses from:

 Half-life, spin, and isomer data selected from the following sources.

 
Tungsten
Tungsten